The Gwangmyeong Speedom is a velodrome in Gwangmyeong, South Korea. It opened in 2006, and has a seating capacity of 10,863 spectators. The venue was designed to resemble a racing cyclist's helmet; and is the largest domed structure ever built in South Korea.

References

Velodromes in South Korea
Sports venues in Gyeonggi Province